The vz. 52 (7,62mm lehký kulomet vzor 52) is a Czechoslovak light machine gun developed after the Second World War for the Czechoslovak Armed Forces.

Description
The vz. 52 was originally called the ZB 501, and was designed by Václav Holek. It is gas-operated and uses a tilting bolt that locks into the roof of the receiver. Its overall action is based on the Czech ZB-26 light machine gun. It has an integral bipod and interchangeable barrels, and its feed system is designed to take metallic belts or box magazines interchangeably and without any modifications. Its compact and light lever-type feeding system was based on the ZB-53 and was later copied in UK vz. 59, PK and Negev.

The vz. 52 initially used the Czech 7.62×45mm vz. 52 cartridge, but in the mid-1950s it was converted to the standard 7.62×39mm Warsaw Pact round by Jaroslav Myslík, and named the vz. 52/57. Both models were replaced in Czech service in 1963–64 by the Universal Machine Gun Model 1959, also known as the Uk vz. 59.

See also

Weapons of comparable role, configuration and era
RP-46
URZ AP
Taden gun
Type 73 light machine gun

References

Bibliography

External sources

http://www.valka.cz/newdesign/v900/clanek_11420.html
http://www.militaria.wz.cz/cs/kulomet-52.htm
http://www.historieavojenstvi.cz/2007/clanky/holek.pdf

7.62×39mm machine guns
Infantry weapons of the Cold War
Light machine guns
Machine guns of Czechoslovakia
Military equipment introduced in the 1950s